Sant'Antonino railway station, also called S. Antonino, is a railway station in the municipality of Sant'Antonino, in the Swiss canton of Ticino. It is an intermediate stop on the standard gauge Giubiasco–Locarno line of Swiss Federal Railways.

Services 
 the following services stop at Sant'Antonino:

References

External links 
 
 

Railway stations in Ticino
Swiss Federal Railways stations